Barbara Petzold (later Beyer, born 8 August 1955) is a former East German Cross-country skier who competed during the 1970s and early 1980s. She won two gold medals at the 1980 Winter Olympics in Lake Placid in the 10 km and the 4 × 5 km relay, and a bronze in the 4 × 5 km relay at the 1976 Winter Olympics in Innsbruck.

Petzold also won four medals at the FIS Nordic World Ski Championships, earning three silvers (1974: 10 km, 4 × 5 km relay; 1978: 4 × 5 km relay) and one bronze (1982: 4 × 5 km relay). She is sometimes listed as Barbara Petzold-Beyer in results lists.

She was a member of the East German legislature or Volkskammer.

Cross-country skiing results
All results are sourced from the International Ski Federation (FIS).

Olympic Games
 3 medals – (2 gold, 1 bronze)

World Championships
 4 medals – (3 silver, 1 bronze)

References

External links

German female cross-country skiers
1955 births
Living people
Cross-country skiers at the 1976 Winter Olympics
Cross-country skiers at the 1980 Winter Olympics
Olympic gold medalists for East Germany
Olympic bronze medalists for East Germany
Olympic medalists in cross-country skiing
FIS Nordic World Ski Championships medalists in cross-country skiing
Female members of the Volkskammer
Members of the Volkskammer
German sportsperson-politicians
Medalists at the 1976 Winter Olympics
Medalists at the 1980 Winter Olympics